Hancom (KOSDAQ: HAANSOFT) is an office suite software developer in South Korea. Established in 1990, the company created Hangul, a native word processing program for the Korean language.

In May 2017 Hancom lost a lawsuit in US Federal Court for violating the GNU GPL license as a consequence of using the source code of PostScript and PDF interpreter Ghostscript. Ghostscript is dual licensed under both the Affero GPL License, or a commercial license. Under the Affero GPL terms, Hancom would be required to open source their code. Alternatively, they could have purchased a license.

On May 27, 2020, Hancom Group announced the unveiling of the latest version of Hancom Office.

Hancom Office

Hancom's Office Suite remains the company's main product. The suite is available in English and Korean.

Product List
 Hancom Office Suite
 HanCell - spreadsheet program
 HanShow - presentation program
 HanWord (also called as Hangul-a.k.a. HWP)
 Hancom Office Hanword
 Hancom Office Hanword Viewer
 Hancom Office 2020  International Version
 Hancom Space
 Hancom Docs Converter

Discontinued Products
Documen
 HanArum - office products
 HanGrim - vector drawing program
 Hangul Print - printing program
 HanMaek - Hangul I/O program
 HanTeX - Hangul TeX program
 NetHangul

References

External links
 

South Korean companies established in 1990
Office suites for Windows
Software companies established in 1990
South Korean brands